WHVL-LD (channel 29) is a low-power television station in State College, Pennsylvania, United States. Owned by Channel Communications, the station has studios on East College Avenue near the Nittany Mall, and its transmitter is located atop Rattlesnake Mountain in Rush Township. WHVL-LD is available on cable throughout the Johnstown–Altoona–State College market.

Programming

Local programming
WHVL was launched on August 31, 2007, with live coverage of the Penn State "Football Eve" pep rally.

With its commitment to local issues and events, WHVL broadcasts many locally produced programs including:
The Centre of It All – (the name refers to Centre County, where the station is based)
WHVL High School Game of the Week – covering local high school football 
BlueWhite Tailgate – covering Penn State football with pre- and post-game coverage. Formerly Penn State Tailgate Show

The station occasionally presents special programs covering topics of local interest. On October 16, 2008, WHVL broadcast a live debate featuring 5th Congressional District candidates. It broadcast the Penn State vs. Lock Haven wrestling match on February 23, 2008.

The station broadcasts local programming produced by others including Pit Pass with co-hosts Ron Fox and Jan Miller, a show covering auto racing in Pennsylvania.

Syndicated programming
Syndicated programming on the station includes The Wendy Williams Show, The Real, Forensic Files, Pawn Stars, Dish Nation, TMZ on TV and NewsNet Nightside Edition. Weather forecasts are provided by an agreement with WeatherVision.

Subchannels
The station's digital signal is multiplexed:

References

External links 
 WHVL website
 WHVL's YouTube Channel - includes full episodes of some of the local programs and ads.

HVL-LD
Low-power television stations in the United States
Buzzr affiliates
Television channels and stations established in 1991
1991 establishments in Pennsylvania